The following is a list of the top Algerian Ligue Professionnelle 1 scorers by season.

Former MC Alger forward Abdeslam Bousri holds the record for the number of times finishing as the top scorer in the league, having done so five times between 1972 and 1983. As of the end of the 2012–13 season, Cheikh Oumar Dabo of Mali is the first foreigner to have finished as the top scorer in a season after scoring 17 goals for JS Kabylie in the 2006–07 Algerian Championnat National.

Winners

By player

By club

By country

All Scorers 
The table below contains the all time top Algerian Ligue Professionnelle 1 goal scorers since in the 1999–2000 season.  The list is accurate until May 26, 2019 which is the end of the 2018–19 Algerian Ligue Professionnelle 1.

Players in bold are still active in the league.

Further reading
 Selhani, Said. (2016) Archives du football algérien II, Algiers, Edition Ed-Diwane.

References

 
Algerian Ligue Professionnelle 1 records and statistics
Algeria
Algeria
Association football player non-biographical articles